In the 2009–10 season, Trabzonspor finished in fifth place in the Süper Lig. The club also won the Turkish Cup for an eighth time. The top scorer of the team was Umut Bulut, who scored eighteen goals.

This article shows statistics of the club's players and matches during the season.

Sponsor
Türk Telekom

Players

Süper Lig

Turkish Cup

Group stage

Quarterfinals
In this round the winners and runners-up of all of the previous round's groups were entered. The draw was conducted at the headquarters of the TFF in İstanbul on 27 January 2010 at 11:00 local time. The teams competed in two-leg playoffs with the first leg occurring on 3 February and the second on 10 February 2010.

The following teams qualified for the Turkish Cup Quarterfinal:

Semifinals
The two legs were played on 24 March and 14 April 2010, respectively.

Final

The final was won by Trabzonspor.

UEFA Europa League

Play-off round

References

Turkish football clubs 2009–10 season
Trabzonspor seasons